Benjamin (Ben) "Danger" Davies (born 2 November 1989) is a professional rugby league footballer who last played as a  for Oldham (Heritage No. 1372) in Kingstone Press League 1. He has previously played for:-
 Wigan Warriors (Heritage No. 1020)
 Widnes Vikings
 Workington Town
 South Wales Scorpions
 Barrow Raiders
 Castleford Tigers (Heritage No. 920)
 Halifax RLFC
 Whitehaven RLFC

Background
Wigan, Greater Manchester, England.

Career
He signed for the Wigan Warriors from local amateur team Leigh East.

He has junior representative honours with Lancashire (at under 14s and 15s level) and England (under 15s and 18s.) At the start of 2010, he was sent out on loan to Widnes. After impressing on his one-month loan, he was dual registered with the Chemics. He made his Super League début off the bench against Crusaders on 22 May 2010. Ben has previously played for Halifax.

References

External links
Oldham profile
 Ben Davies Wigan Career Page on the Wigan RL Fansite.
Statistics at thecastlefordtigers.co.uk

1989 births
Living people
Barrow Raiders players
Castleford Tigers players
English rugby league players
Halifax R.L.F.C. players
Oldham R.L.F.C. players
Rugby league players from Wigan
Rugby league props
South Wales Scorpions players
Whitehaven R.L.F.C. players
Widnes Vikings players
Wigan Warriors players
Workington Town players